The Total Woman is a self-help book for married women by Marabel Morgan published in 1973. The book sold over 500,000 copies within the first year, making it the most successful non-fiction book in the USA in 1974. Overall, it sold more than ten million copies. Grounded in evangelical Christianity, it taught that "A Total Woman caters to her man's special quirks, whether it be in salads, sex or sports," and is perhaps best remembered for instructing wives to greet their man at the front door wearing sexy outfits; suggestions included "a cowgirl or a showgirl." "It's only when a woman surrenders her life to her husband, reveres and worships him and is willing to serve him, that she becomes really beautiful to him," Morgan wrote.

Inspiration and development
In 1970, Morgan founded Total Woman, Inc., a company that was concerned with marketing this idea. From then on, she gave seminars for Christian-oriented married women about how they should conduct themselves in deference towards their husbands. The seminars consisted of four two-hour sessions for $15. After several years, she had trained more than 100 instructors, who gave further courses in 28 states and Canada. By 1975, there were over 15,000 graduates, including the singer Anita Bryant, the wives of Jack Nicklaus and Joe Frazier, and 12 wives of players from the  Miami Dolphins football team.

Morgan wrote her four basic ideas—ignoring the mistakes of the husband and focusing on his virtues, admiring him physically, appreciating him, and adapting to the idea that the husband was the king and his wife was the queen—down in a book, The Total Woman. It was published in December 1973 by the small publishing house Fleming H. Revell Company,  a subsidiary of the evangelically-oriented Baker Publishing Group. The first printing was 5,000 copies. The book sold over 500,000 copies within the first year, making it the best-selling non-fiction book in the USA in 1974. The paperback rights were sold for over $600,000.

References

External links
 Marabel Morgan, ohiohistorycentral.org
 Totally Marabel, sun-sentinel.com
 Marabel & Charlie Morgan: Being a Total Woman May Mean Love Under the Dinner Table, people.com
 The New Housewife Blues, footenotes.net

1973 non-fiction books
Self-help books
American non-fiction books